The Women's time trial of the 2013 UCI Road World Championships took place on 24 September 2013 in the region of Tuscany, Italy. The course of the race was 22.05 km from Parco delle Cascine to the Nelson Mandela Forum in Florence.

Ellen van Dijk from the Netherlands lived up her expectations as main favourite and won the time trial by dominating the race, beating perennial podium finisher Linda Villumsen and the surprising American Carmen Small.

Qualification
All National Federations may enter 4 riders of whom 2 may start. Besides of that, the outgoing World Champion and the continental champions may take part in addition to this number.

Participating nations

32 nations participated in the women's time trial.

  Australia
  Austria
  Belgium
  Belarus
  Brazil
  Canada
  Colombia
  Croatia
  Denmark
  Spain
  Finland
  France
  Germany
  Italy
  Jordan
  Japan
  Latvia
  Lithuania
  Mexico
  Mongolia
  Netherlands
  Norway
  New Zealand
  Poland
  Russia
  Slovenia
  Switzerland
  Sweden
  Thailand
  Uganda
  Ukraine
  United States

Preview
Ellen van Dijk, the Dutch National time trial Champion and the number 5 in the time trial at the 2012 UCI Road World Championships was the absolute favourite. She won many time trials in the 2013 women's road season. Of the 10 time trials she rode she won eight of them including the time trial at the prestigious Giro d'Italia Femminile and a week before the championships the Chrono Champenois – Trophée Européen. Van Dijk did not win two time trials, Emma Johansson from Sweden beat her in the Emakumeen Euskal Bira and Shara Gillow from Australia in the Thüringen Rundfahrt der Frauen.

Hanna Solovey, a Ukrainian track cyslint, won the time trial at the European Road Championships, the only race she rode before the World Championships. With an average speed of over 47 km/h it was the fastest average speed in a time trial of the season. Linda Villumsen, who was on the podium in the last four editions, and Evelyn Stevens were other podium candidates.

Schedule

Source

Race
Danish mountain biker Annika Langvad, who finished 6th in the end, was the early leader after setting a time of 28' 27" and stayed in the hot seat for a long time. German Trixi Worrack, the first of the final 10 riders to finish, took over the lead after finishing in a time of 28' 19". The Dutch Ellen van Dijk was the fastest from the start by riding 20 second faster than Linda Villumsen and 24 seconds faster than Carmen Small at the first time point. At the second split the gaps were 25 and 28 seconds respectively. Van Dijk lost one second to Villumsen in the final five kilometres but her margin was large enough to win her second world title of the championship after winning the team time trial with her  squad on Sunday. For Villumsen it was her fifth consecutive time on the world championship time trial podium, but never won the rainbow jersey.

Medalists reactions

 Ellen van Dijk 
Van Dijk lived up the expectations as main favourite and won the time trial by dominating the race.
"I'm super happy. It's difficult to describe how I feel now", she said after the race. "I'm so excited because I dreamt so long of this one and the pressure was high to finish it off. It's great to have won. My intention was to start fast but I wanted to keep going a bit longer than I did. I maybe got over excited and a went too fast, but I maintained the time difference and so it was all ok." This race was the seasons' main goal for Van Dijk. She had been tested on her time trial position during the season and found a better position which she was able to maintain for almost half an hour. Van Dijk told she practiced the course twice in August at 5:00am to avoid traffic and made video recordings of the course to get to know the turns. She had watched the video over and over again until she could dream it.

 Linda Villumsen 
Villumsen rode the New Zealand National Time Trial Championships in January before backing off until June. She rode the Giro Rosa and won La Route de France and the time trial at the Tour Cycliste Féminin International de l'Ardèche before heading to World Championships. "It was a different year for me but a good year." She said in an interview. "I started late and with a different approach. I trained more at home and then did race after race. I enjoyed it. I was still there on the podium so I can thank my team for helping me this far." Villumsen, a former a Danish national road race champion, switched her nationality in 2010 from Danish to New Zealand. It was her fifth straight podium at the world championships in the time trial. She took her first bronze in 2009, 2010 and 2012, and won silver in her former home country in 2011. "It's not bad luck." Villumsen said. "If someone is better, they deserve to win. Ellen van Dijk has been riding very well all throughout the year, she has won all kinds of time trials, short ones, long ones. She really deserved to win. A place on the podium is still nice. I go close every year but something is missing. I'll try to work it out and go all the way to the top perhaps next year."

 Carmen Small 
She won her first medal at the World Championships.
"I’m pretty surprised, I didn’t expect to actually podium. I thought top five would be a really good ride for me. Jim Miller (USA Cycling vice president of athletics) and I met before and I really wanted Jim in the car talking to me because he was in the car at Nationals with me when I won. I just buried myself in the last 500 meters. I knew it was going to hurt, but it hurts for everyone. With 100 meters to go I wanted to quit, but I did one more click down on my gears and I just counted the pedal strokes to get me to the finish. This hurt worse than I’ve ever hurt before." She also felt sorry for Evelyn Stevens who missed a place on the podium by 0.04 seconds. "It's a very bittersweet feeling for me. Evelyn is a good friend, a teammate and a fellow countryman. We've spent a lot of time together this season and it's hard to have been beaten and have it be so close".

Final classification
Of the 48 riders on the starting list, 3 riders did not start.

DNS = did not start
|}

References

Women's time trial
UCI Road World Championships – Women's time trial
2013 in women's road cycling